Muesee Kazapua (born 1980) is a SWAPO politician based in Windhoek, the capital of Namibia. He was the mayor of Windhoek from 2014 to 2019.

Kazapua attended Windhoek's Augustineum Secondary School and holds tertiary degrees in Youth Development, Local Government Administration, and Management. He is a member of the SWAPO Youth League and a former member of the Namibia National Students Organisation (NANSO).

References

1980 births
Living people
Mayors of Windhoek
SWAPO politicians
Augustineum Secondary School alumni